Vladimiri is a surname. Notable people with the surname include:

 Paulus Vladimiri (ca. 1370 - 1435), Polish scholar, jurist and rector of the Cracow Academy
Tudor din Vladimiri (Tudor of Vladimiri)

See also 
 Vladimir (name)
 Vladimir (disambiguation)
 Tudor Vladimirescu
 Vladimirsky (disambiguation)
 Vladimirov
 Vladimirovo (disambiguation)
 Vladimirovich

Patronymics
Toponymic surnames
Latin-language surnames